Epiphania or Epiphaneia is the feminine form of the name Epiphanius, and may refer to:

Hama, Syria, formerly known as Epiphania
Epiphania (Bithynia), a town of ancient Bithynia
Epiphania (Cilicia), a city in Cilicia, now ruined
Epiphaneia (horse), a race horse
Eudoxia Epiphania, daughter of the Byzantine Emperor Heraclius
Saint Epiphania of Pavia, an 8th-century Italian nun
Epiphania, a poem by George Seferis
 The musical setting of this poem by Mikis Theodorakis
 The Christian festival of Epiphany